Paris 05:59: Théo & Hugo (also known as Theo and Hugo in some territories) is a 2016 French erotic romantic drama film written and directed by Olivier Ducastel and Jacques Martineau. It was shown in the Panorama section at the 66th Berlin International Film Festival. The film won the Audience Award at the Berlin Festival's 2016 Teddy Awards.

The film stars Geoffrey Couët and François Nambot as two gay men who meet during the film's opening 20-minute scene at L'Impact, a gay sex club, and follows them as they get to know each other during the next two hours, biking and walking in northeast Paris, visiting a hospital, riding the metro, and visiting one's apartment, encountering a woman on the Paris Métro and a counter server in a kebab shop.  The action of the film begins at 4:27 am and concludes at 5:59 am.

The film was filmed over the course of 15 days, including nine nights, on a small budget. The original script set the film over the course of 28 days, but was later changed to occur during real-time in the course of 93 minutes in the early morning hours.

Cast
 Geoffrey Couët as Théo
 François Nambot as Hugo

References

External links
 

2016 films
2016 LGBT-related films
2016 romantic drama films
2010s erotic drama films
2010s French-language films
Erotic romance films
Films directed by Jacques Martineau
Films directed by Olivier Ducastel
Films set in Paris
Films shot in Paris
French erotic drama films
French LGBT-related films
French romantic drama films
Gay-related films
HIV/AIDS in French films
LGBT-related romantic drama films
2010s French films